Lismore railway station is a heritage-listed former station on the Murwillumbah line at Lismore, New South Wales, Australia. It was added to the New South Wales State Heritage Register on 2 April 1999.

The station forecourt is served by NSW TrainLink coach services to Casino and Tweed Heads.

History
The station opened on 15 May 1894. It closed on 16 May 2004 when the line from Casino was closed.

Platforms & services
Lismore had one platform, with a passing loop. It was served by trains from Sydney including the North Coast Mail until 1973 when replaced by the Gold Coast Motorail which in February 1990 was replaced by a XPT service.

Description
The former station complex consists of a third-class timber station building of a type 4 standard roadside design with a brick platform; a 2-road carriage shed with a sawtooth roof, originally 15 bays and later extended to 21 bays and a 2-road, corrugated iron locomotive shed in a straight shed design, all dating from 1894. The former station residence is located at 18 Malendy Drive.

Heritage listing 
Lismore station and yard group is an excellent group of railway structures with elements rarely found together and extant on the rail system. The station building is a rare timber roadside station with excellent detailing and a very fine verandah to the street facade. The utility buildings are individually significant as rare examples of their type and together in a group. The whole group forms an important unit in the townscape of Lismore and, combined with adjacent civic buildings, contributes important elements to the townscape.

Lismore railway station was listed on the New South Wales State Heritage Register on 2 April 1999 having satisfied the following criteria.

The place possesses uncommon, rare or endangered aspects of the cultural or natural history of New South Wales.

This item is assessed as historically rare. This item is assessed as scientifically rare. This item is assessed as arch. rare. This item is assessed as socially rare.

References

External links
Lismore History of Western Australian Railway & Stations gallery
Lismore station details Transport for New South Wales

Disused regional railway stations in New South Wales
Lismore, New South Wales
Railway stations in Australia opened in 1894
Railway stations closed in 2004
New South Wales State Heritage Register
Murwillumbah railway line